Ira Richardson (1871 – October 6, 1958) was a president of Northwest Missouri State University and founding president of Adams State College.

Early life
Richardson was a native of northern Missouri and received a degree from Central Methodist University in 1897.

He received two master's degrees from Columbia University.

Northwest Missouri
He was president at Northwest from 1913 to 1921.

Highlights of his time at the school:
The school got its nickname of Bearcats in 1916
The Tower yearbook first publication in 1917
First degree class graduates in 1917
Tornado hits the Administration building on March 15, 1919

Adams State College
He served as Adams president from its founding in 1925 until 1950.  Highlights of his stay:

Richardson Hall (named for him was built)
He was one of three faculty on the first semester in 1925
Green and white were adopted as school colors in 1926
Adams State Normal School name change Adams State Teachers College in 1930
President's home and faculty apartments (Casa del Sol) constructed in 1929
Casa Bonita and Kit Carson Hall dorms opened in 1936
Rex Activity Center opened in 1939
It began offering graduate classes in 1944
When he retired enrollment was 349 in 1950.

References

1871 births
1958 deaths
Presidents of Northwest Missouri State University
Central Methodist University alumni
Columbia University alumni
Adams State University alumni